This is a list of mountains of Liechtenstein, they are all within the Rätikon range of the Eastern Alps.

References

 
Liechtenstein
Mountains
Liechtenstein